Bicornin is an ellagitannin found in the Myrtales Trapa bicornis (water caltrop) and Syzygium aromaticum (clove).

The molecule contains a luteic acid group.

References

External links 

Ellagitannins